Borlänge Municipality (Borlänge kommun) is a municipality in Dalarna County in central Sweden, with an area of 586.4 km². The municipality has a population of 47,640 (2007). The municipal seat is Borlänge.

The present municipality was created in 1971 when the City of Borlänge (itself instituted as a city in 1944) was reunited with the rural municipality of Stora Tuna, from which it had been detached in 1898.

Riksdag elections

Education 
 Dalarna University College
 Soltorgsgymnasiet

Notable natives 
Jussi Björling, tenor
Lars Frölander, swimmer
Mando Diao, rock band
Sugarplum Fairy, pop band
Per Fosshaug, bandy player
Dozer, stoner rock band
Erik Eriksson, Centre Party's first chairman
Lars Jonsson, ice hockey player
Sator, rock band
Nadja Brandt, writer and also appeared as an extra in Twilight
Linda Carlsson, musician (also known as Miss Li)
Tove Alexandersson, orienteering, ski-orienteering and skyrunning world champion
Per Johansson, swimmer

References

External links 

Borlänge - Official site

Municipalities of Dalarna County